Géographica is the French-language magazine of the Royal Canadian Geographical Society (RCGS), published under the Society's French name, the Société géographique royale du Canada (SGRC). Introduced in 1997, Géographica is not a stand-alone publication, but is published as an irregular supplement to La Presse. It was formerly quarterly supplement to L'actualité.

The English-language sister publication is Canadian Geographic.

References

External links
 Géographica on-line

French-language magazines published in Canada
Geographic magazines
Magazines established in 1997
Newspaper supplements
Quarterly magazines published in Canada
Science and technology magazines published in Canada